Wairoa Aerodrome  is a small airport located at the end of Airport Road, on the northern outskirts of Wairoa, in Hawke's Bay, New Zealand. Wairoa Aerodrome provides a service for light aircraft and is used mainly for charter operations. There are no scheduled flights.

Operational data
Wairoa Aerodrome is a grass strip of 1371 m in length containing an all-weather sealed strip of 914 m on its southern two thirds.

Runway strength:
16/34: ESWL 9530
Pilot controlled runway lighting available
Circuit:
Fixed wing - left hand all runways

See also

 List of airports in New Zealand
 List of airlines of New Zealand
 Transport in New Zealand

References

Airports in New Zealand
Transport buildings and structures in the Hawke's Bay Region
Wairoa